Baillarge Bay is an Arctic waterway in the Qikiqtaaluk Region, Nunavut, Canada. It is the second waterway to press eastward from Admiralty Inlet into Baffin Island. The southern point of its mouth is named Ship Point.

Geography

Fauna
The uninhabited bay is a Canadian Important Bird Area (#NU067) stretching  up the coastline to Elwin Inlet. It is also an International Biological Program site (Region 9, #7-7) and Key Migratory Bird Terrestrial Habitat site (NU Site 19).

A sizeable population of northern fulmars are found here. Caribou, polar bears, and walruses, as well as harp seals, ringed seals, and white whales frequent the area.

References

Bays of Baffin Island
Important Bird Areas of Qikiqtaaluk Region
Important Bird Areas of Arctic islands
Seabird colonies